Leonid Stanislavovich Kuchuk (born 27 August 1959) is a Belarusian football manager and former professional player.

Managerial career
On 15 September 2014, Kuchuk was suspended as head coach of Lokomotiv Moscow, whilst the board agreed the termination of his contract.

On 18 September 2014, Kuchuk was sacked as manager of Lokomotiv Moscow after the side made a disappointing start to the season.

In 2017, he was a manager of the Ukrainian Premier League club Stal Kamianske.

On 9 June 2017, he was hired as the manager of the Russian Premier League side FC Rostov. He resigned from Rostov on 6 December 2017.

On 1 February 2019, Kuchuk was announced as the next manager of the Ukrainian First League club Rukh Vynnyky.

Personal
His son Aliaksei Kuchuk is a professional football player.

Honours

Manager
Sheriff Tiraspol
Divizia Naţională (6): 2003–04, 2004–05, 2005–06, 2006–07, 2007–08, 2008–09
Moldovan Cup (3): 2005–06, 2007–08, 2008–09
Moldovan Cup runner-up (1): 2003–04
Moldovan Super Cup (3): 2004, 2005, 2007
CIS Cup (1): 2009

Lokomotiv
Russian Premier League 3rd : 2013–14

Individual

 Manager of the Year in Moldova:  2009
 Manager of the Year in Ukraine: 2011–12
 Manager of the Year in Belarus:  2013
 Manager of the Month in Russian Football Premier League (2): August, November 2013

References

External links
 
 

1959 births
Living people
Footballers from Minsk
Soviet footballers
Belarusian footballers
Association football defenders
FC Dinamo Minsk players
FC Gomel players
FC Vitebsk players
FC Molodechno players
FC Ataka Minsk players
FC Dinamo-93 Minsk players
Soviet Second League players
Soviet Second League B players
Belarusian football managers
Belarusian expatriate football managers
Expatriate football managers in Moldova
Expatriate football managers in Russia
Expatriate football managers in Ukraine
Belarusian expatriate sportspeople in Moldova
Belarusian expatriate sportspeople in Russia
Belarusian expatriate sportspeople in Ukraine
Ukrainian Premier League managers
Ukrainian First League managers
Russian Premier League managers
Moldovan Super Liga managers
FC Dinamo-93 Minsk managers
FC Molodechno managers
FC Sheriff Tiraspol managers
FC Arsenal Kyiv managers
FC Kuban Krasnodar managers
FC Lokomotiv Moscow managers
FC Stal Kamianske managers
FC Rostov managers
FC Rukh Lviv managers
FC Dinamo Minsk managers